Antisleep Vol. 04 is the sixth studio album by American multi-genre project Blue Stahli, and the fourth in the instrumental Antisleep series. It is the first in the series to be released in "chapters". The first of which was completed and released, as a surprise, on June 5, 2015. The full album, which includes 6 additional tracks, was released on August 25, 2017. This is the last Blue Stahli album to be released by FiXT Music, as he left without any prior announcement.

Track listing

References 

2015 albums
Blue Stahli albums